Admiral is a four-star commissioned naval flag officer rank in the Bangladesh Navy. It is the highest achieved rank in the Bangladesh Navy. Admiral ranks above the three-star rank of Vice Admiral.

The rank is denoted as a full-fledged Admiral to extricate subordinate officers like Vice Admiral and Rear Admiral.

The rank was established in 2016, when Admiral M. Farid Habib was promoted to this rank. The Chief of Naval Staff (CNS) is the only officer awarded the rank.

Insignia 
The badges of rank have a crossed sword and baton over four eight-pointed stars and the Shapla emblem above, on a golden shoulder board.

The uniform code also has golden gorget patches with four stars which represents the four star rank.

In accumulation to this, the double-breasted reefer jacket have four golden sleeve stripes consisting of a broad band with three narrower bands.

Appointment and term length 
The position is appointed by the Prime Minister of The People's Republic of Bangladesh with the advice and consent of the President of Bangladesh. The maximum length of the term is 4 years. The position constituted through the act of Navy Ordinance, 1961 (Ordinance No. XXXV of 1961).

See also 
 List of serving admirals of the Bangladesh Navy
 Military ranks of Bangladesh

References 

Military ranks of Bangladesh
Admirals